Montmagny was a federal electoral district in Quebec, Canada, that was represented in the House of Commons of Canada from 1867 to 1935.

This riding was created by the British North America Act, 1867. It consisted initially of the County of Montmagny. In 1882, the northeastern part of the Township of Armagh in the County of Bellechasse, and the northeastern part of the township of Mailloux, were transferred from Bellechasse to Montmagny. In 1924, it was redefined to consist of the County of Montmagny and the Ile-aux-Grues and adjoining islands.

It was abolished in 1933 when it was redistributed into the Bellechasse and Montmagny—L'Islet electoral districts.

Members of Parliament

This riding elected the following Members of Parliament:

Election results

See also 

 List of Canadian federal electoral districts
 Past Canadian electoral districts

External links
Riding history from the Library of Parliament

Former federal electoral districts of Quebec